The Valdina Farms salamander (Eurycea troglodytes) is a species of aquatic salamander described from Valdina Farms Sinkhole in Medina County, Texas, United States. It is sometimes referred to as the Valdina blind salamander or sinkhole salamander. As some other species of Eurycea found in Texas, it was once classified as a subspecies of the Texas salamander, Eurycea neotenes, and believed to possibly be the result of hybridization with another species of subterranean salamander, but was granted full species status in 2000. Research is ongoing, and some sources suggest the current species may actually be multiple distinct species.

Description 
They are grey- or cream-colored, and translucent, sometimes with pale yellow striping or white speckling. Few specimens are known, so the variability of their color and pattern is unknown.

Behavior 
It is entirely aquatic, and mostly subterranean, found in springs deep in limestone crevices, which makes definitively establishing its complete geographic range or its population numbers very difficult.

References 
  (2000): Phylogenetic relationships of central Texas hemidactyliine plethodontid salamanders, genus Eurycea, and a taxonomic revision of the group. Herpetological Monographs 14: 1-80.
  (2001): A new species of subterranean blind salamander (Plethodontidae: Hemidactyliini: Eurycea: Typhlomolge) from Austin, Texas, and a systematic revision of central Texas paedomorphic salamanders. Herpetologica 57: 266–280.
Herps of Texas: Eurycea troglodytes
Amphibian Species of the World: Eurycea troglodytes
IUCN Red List of Threatened Species: Eurycea troglodytes

Troglodytes
Cave salamanders
Amphibians described in 1957